The women's sprint competition of the Biathlon European Championships 2012 was held on January 28, 2012 at 13:00 local time.

Results

External links
 Results

Biathlon European Championships 2012
2012 in Slovak women's sport